Emmanuel Afriyie Mario Sabbi (born December 24, 1997) is an American professional soccer player who plays as a winger or forward for Danish Superliga club Odense BK.

Youth
Sabbi was born in Italy to Ghanaian parents. He grew up in the United States, however, and for the majority of his youth, he played for Ohio Premier Soccer Club in Columbus, Ohio. Ohio Premier became national finalists at the 2014 USYS National Championships in Maryland. Sabbi won the golden boot and was named most valuable player of the tournament. He then moved on to Chicago Magic PSG for a few years before signing a youth contract with Spanish side Las Palmas.

Club career
Sabbi initially committed to play at the University of Akron but opted to sign a reserve contract with UD Las Palmas instead.
After a year with Las Palmas, Sabbi signed a professional deal with newly-promoted Hobro IK in Denmark. He made his professional debut as a sub in a loss to FC Midtjylland on September 17, 2017.

In January 2020, Sabbi agreed to a free transfer with Odense Boldklub at the end of the season.

International
Sabbi was eligible to represent Ghana, Italy, and the United States. He represented the United States at the 2017 FIFA U-20 World Cup, appearing in two games, cap-tying him to the United States.

Career statistics

Club

International

Honors
United States U20
CONCACAF Under-20 Championship: 2017

References

External links

1997 births
Living people
Association football forwards
Sportspeople from Vicenza
American soccer players
United States men's youth international soccer players
United States men's under-20 international soccer players
Hobro IK players
Danish Superliga players
American expatriate soccer players
American expatriate sportspeople in Spain
American expatriate sportspeople in Denmark
Expatriate footballers in Spain
Expatriate men's footballers in Denmark
American people of Ghanaian descent
Italian people of Ghanaian descent
Italian sportspeople of African descent
United States men's under-23 international soccer players
Footballers from Veneto
United States men's international soccer players